Eric Bryant (18 November 1921 – December 1995) was an English footballer who played league football for Mansfield Town, Plymouth Argyle and Leyton Orient.

He is also notable for scoring the winning goal for non-league Yeovil Town in their FA Cup victory against Sunderland in 1949. In October 1949, Bryant was signed by Plymouth from Yeovil for a fee of £3,000.

References

External links
 Career statistics

1921 births
1995 deaths
Footballers from Birmingham, West Midlands
Association football forwards
Mansfield Town F.C. players
Yeovil Town F.C. players
Plymouth Argyle F.C. players
Leyton Orient F.C. players
Chelmsford City F.C. players
Bideford A.F.C. players
Poole Town F.C. players
English Football League players
English footballers